Liberty Memorial is the former name of the National World War I Museum and Memorial.

It can also refer to:

 Liberty Memorial, Copenhagen, commemorating the abolition of serfdom in Denmark
 Liberty Memorial Building, in Bismarck, North Dakota
 Liberty Memorial Bridge, connecting Bismarck and Mandan, North Dakota
 Shipka Monument, also known as Liberty Memorial, commemorating the liberation of Bulgaria